Educated Evans is a British comedy television series which aired on the BBC in 24 episodes between 2 October 1957 and 24 June 1958. It is based on the 1924 novel Educated Evans by Edgar Wallace, about a racing tipster. The story had previously been made into a 1936 film Educated Evans. The title role was played by Charlie Chester, whose comedic style was similar to that of Max Miller who had starred in the earlier film. Jack Melford starred as his antagonist, Detective Sergeant Miller.

Other actors who appeared in episodes of the series included Sid James, Jackie Collins, Georgina Cookson, Jill Adams, Sydney Tafler, Liz Fraser, Deryck Guyler, Sam Kydd, Eunice Gayson, Danny Green, Robert Raglan, Anita Sharp-Bolster, Ray Cooney, Jack MacGowran, Ian Fleming, Erik Chitty, Diane Hart, Terence Alexander, Alan Tilvern, Charles Farrell and Mavis Villiers.

Main cast
 Charlie Chester as  'Educated' Evans 
 Michael Balfour as  Man in Pub 
 Jack Melford as  Det. Sgt. Miller 
 Myrtle Reed as  Gertrude, the Barmaid 
 Dorothy Summers as  Mrs. Boltons 
 Keith Pyott as  Inspector Pine 
 Leonard Sharp as  Old Sam Toggs 
 Mae Bacon as  Mrs. Wilkes 
 Patricia Hayes as  Emma Toggs

References

Bibliography
 Stephen Wagg. Because I Tell a Joke or Two: Comedy, Politics and Social Difference. Routledge, 2004.

External links
 

BBC television comedy
1957 British television series debuts
1958 British television series endings
1950s British comedy television series
English-language television shows
Television shows based on British novels